The Barranquilla metro is a Colombian metropolitan area centered on Barranquilla. It is located in the north of the country and belongs to Atlántico Department. Four other municipalities also belong to the region. These are Soledad, Galapa, Puerto Colombia and Malambo.

The city of Barranquilla serves as a major trade center for Colombia, housing the largest port in the country. With an estimated population of 1.2 million, every major company in the country keeps at least one major depot or distribution center in the urban areas and most international brands utilize the port while having their logistic operating bases in the region.

Due to rapid growth, the region has undergone a series of successive projects intended to harmonize the city and the smaller towns that form its commuter belt, such as the creation of regional lines in the TransMetro of Barranquilla, the bus rapid transit system of the city, to allow for faster commute times.

The city of Barranquilla is home to Atlético Junior, the main team in Colombia's First Division Football league for the entire conurbation.  and Estadio Metropolitano Roberto Meléndez. The stadium was inaugurated in 1986 and is the main venue of local games. Barranquilla holds one of the largest Carnaval celebrations, second to Rio de Janeiro's in Brazil. It commemorates Colombian music, food and culture, hosting parades of traditional Colombian experiences, amongst more. The event routinely draws locals and tourists alike, forming a part of the city's historical holidays.

Local celebrities and personalities have included Sofia Vergara, Shakira, Paulina Vega, Nina Garcia, and Carmen Villalobos.

Urbanization has become a vital part of the city's economy. This conurbation has grown significantly as a direct result of this and led the region to emerge as a metropolitan hub for the country's Atlantic coast. 
 
The region as a whole is overseen by a regional director. The current incumbent is Jaime Berdugo.

External links 
 Área Metropolitana de Barranquilla
 

Metropolitan areas of Colombia
Barranquilla